Orpha is an unincorporated community in Converse County, Wyoming, United States. The town lies just north of the Burlington Northern Santa Fe Railway and the North Platte River. Several miles to Orpha's northeast lies a historic Hog Ranch saloon, c. 1882, well known for its gambling operations. (See Fort Laramie Three-Mile Hog Ranch for an example of this kind of saloon.) Fort Fetterman lies across the river from Orpha, a few miles downstream.

References

Unincorporated communities in Wyoming
Unincorporated communities in Converse County, Wyoming